The little bunting (Emberiza pusilla) is a passerine bird belonging to the bunting family (Emberizidae).

Taxonomy
First described by Peter Simon Pallas in 1776, the little bunting is a monotypic species, with no geographical variation across its extensive Palearctic range.

The genus name Emberiza is from Old German Embritz, a bunting. The specific pusilla is Latin for "very small".

Description
This is a small bunting, measuring only  in length. It has white underparts with dark streaking on the breast and sides. With its chestnut face and white malar stripe, it resembles a small female reed bunting, but has black crown stripes, a white eye-ring, and a fine dark border to the rear of its chestnut cheeks. The sexes are similar.

The call is a distinctive zik, and the song is a rolling siroo-sir-sir-siroo.

Ecology
The little bunting breeds across the taiga of the far north-east of Europe and northern Eurosiberia to the Russian Far East. It is migratory, wintering in the subtropics in northern India, southern China and the northern parts of south-east Asia. The birds remain in their winter quarters for quite long; specimens were taken in Yunnan in late March. It is a rare vagrant to western Europe. This species is adaptable; in the mountains of Bhutan for example, where small numbers winter, it is typically found in an agricultural habitat, mostly between  ASL.

It breeds in open coniferous woodland, often with some birch or willow. Four to six eggs are laid in a tree nest. Its natural food consists of seeds, or when feeding young, insects.

A common and widely-ranging species, it is not considered threatened on the IUCN Red List.

References

Cited works

External links

OBC 29 photographs (see pulldown menu at page bottom)

little bunting
Birds of Russia
Birds of Manchuria
little bunting